Gerhard Friedrich Hund (born February 4, 1932 in Leipzig) is a German chess player, mathematician and computer scientist.

Biography
He is the oldest son of physicist Friedrich Hund (1896–1997). He studied at the Friedrich Schiller University in Jena (1950–1951) and at the Goethe University Frankfurt (1951–1955). In 1955 he met his wife Juliane Hund (née Meyer). They had four daughters Susanne van Kempen (b.1958), Barbara Hund (b.1959), Isabel Hund (b.1962) and Dorothee Lampe (b.1966). After graduation, he was collaborator of Alwin Walther at the Institute of Applied Mathematics of the Technische Hochschule Darmstadt.

From 1961 to 1995 he was Chief Executive of Bayer in Leverkusen.<ref>Commander EIS at Bayer AG. Apple Age 9/Frühjahr No 1991, p 34</ref>H. Schappert: For DV Development at Bayer. Bayer AG, Leverkusen, AV computer science, 1985.

Bibliography Standards for assessing the performance of electronic computing machine In. Economic management. Releases for personal information Vol 4, June, 1958 ., pp. 3–7 and August 3–10 p. Structure recognition and machine learning. Electronic computing systems, Issue 3, September 1959, pp. 111 Journal of Technology and application of message processing in science, business and management. R. Oldenbourg in Munich and Vienna, 1959.
 With H. Schappert: Programming for the IBM 650, lecture and practical 1959 Institute of Applied Mathematics, Technical University of Darmstadt, summer semester, 1959..
 Book reviews. E.g. In: VDI magazine Vol 101, No. 27, 1959, p 1297th.
 With Wolfgang Möhlen: Report on the British computer systems In: leaves the German Society for Insurance Mathematics Vol 4, H. No. 4, April 1960 , pp. 454–461.
 With Günther Kern, Egon Rissmann: Gynecological cancer early diagnosis using cytology In:' Archives of Gynecology Vol 199, No. 5, 1964, pp. 502–525, DOI .
 With Günther Kern, Egon Rissmann: The performance of colposcopy early diagnosis of Collumcarcinoms In:' Archives of Gynecology Vol 199, No. 5, 1964, pp. 526–539, .
 With H. Fink: Probit analysis using program-controlled computer systems In drug research Vol 15, 1965, pp. 624–630.
 With H. Fink and D. Meysing: Comparison of biological effects by programmed probit In Methods of information in medicine Vol 5, No. 1, pp. 19–25.
 FORTRAN Dictionary. In Leaves the German Society for Insurance Mathematics Vol 8, No. 3, October 1967, pp. 499–520.
 With W. Barthel and M. Wolf-Litt: Data processing businessman. Sheets for Professional Studies, Volume 1, Published by the Federal Employment Agency, Nuremberg, in cooperation with the German trade union federation, Düsseldorf. 1–IX A 303 Bertelsmann Verlag Bielefeld 1 Edition, 1973, No. 12.90.252.164 E, 15 pages.
 With Th Dimmling: Comparison of two ampicillin preparations juice In: Medicine'' Vol 69, April 1974 , pp. 642–645, PMID. 4,837,276th

See also 
 Dortmund Sparkassen Chess Meeting
 Chess of the Grandmasters

References

External links 

 
 
  of Herbert Bastian (President German Chess Federation).
 website of Gerhard Hund

1932 births
Living people
German computer scientists
German chess players
20th-century German mathematicians
Scientists from Leipzig
University of Jena alumni
Academic staff of Technische Universität Darmstadt